Jorge Castro (22 June 1919 – 5 August 2011) was a Mexican gymnast. He competed in eight events at the 1948 Summer Olympics.

References

External links
 

1919 births
2011 deaths
Mexican male artistic gymnasts
Olympic gymnasts of Mexico
Gymnasts at the 1948 Summer Olympics
Place of birth missing
20th-century Mexican people